The men's 4 × 100 metre medley relay - 34 points swimming events for the 2020 Summer Paralympics took place at the Tokyo Aquatics Centre on 3 September 2021.

Competition format
Relay teams are based on a point score. The sport class of an individual swimmer is worth the actual number value i.e. sport class S6 is worth six points, sport class S12 is worth twelve points, and so on. The total of all the  competitors must add up to 34 points or less.

Heats
The teams with the top eight times, regardless of heat, advanced to the final.

Final

References

Swimming at the 2020 Summer Paralympics